Miss Rondônia is a Brazilian Beauty pageant which selects the representative for the State of Rondônia at the Miss Brazil contest. The pageant was created in 1964 and has been held every year since with the exception of 1954-1963, 1969, 1977-1978, 1990, 1991, 1993, and 2020. The pageant is held annually with representation of several municipalities. Since 2021, there has been no official State Director of the pageant as the contest is under the direct leadership of the Miss Universe Brazil Organization. Rondônia still has yet to win any crowns in the national contest

Results Summary

Placements
Miss Brazil: 
1st Runner-Up: Adriana Reis (1998)
2nd Runner-Up: 
3rd Runner-Up: Úrsula Mendes (1997)
4th Runner-Up: 
Top 5/Top 8/Top 9: Ana Maria Façanha Gaspar (1966)
Top 10/Top 11/Top 12: Marisa Marin Delgado (1989);  (2004); Iaisa Helena Ribeiro (2007)
Top 15/Top 16:

Special Awards
Miss Congeniality: Zoracy Parra Motta (1971); Yete de Fátima Baleeiro (1979);  (2014)
Best State Costume:

Titleholders

Table Notes

References

External links
Official Miss Brasil Website

Women in Brazil
Rondônia
Miss Brazil state pageants